The 108th Operations Group is a unit of the 108th Wing (108 WG) of the New Jersey Air National Guard, one of the many units stationed at Joint Base McGuire-Dix-Lakehurst, New Jersey. If activated to federal service with the U.S. Air Force, the group is gained by Air Mobility Command (AMC).

Its World War II predecessor, the 348th Fighter Group, was the most successful Republic P-47 Thunderbolt group in the Southwest Pacific Theater. Its commander, Neel E. Kearby was awarded the Medal of Honor for his actions in combat.  Over a dozen of the group's pilots became aces.

Overview
The 108th Group mission is air refueling. The wing enhances the Air Force's capability to accomplish its primary missions of Global Reach and Global Power. It also provides aerial refueling support to Air Force, Navy and Marine Corps aircraft as well as aircraft of allied nations. The wing is also capable of transporting litter and ambulatory patients using patient support pallets during aeromedical evacuations.

In addition to their primary air refueling mission, the Wing also supports an Intelligence Squadron and a Contingency Response Group

Units 
The 108th Operations Group consists of the following units:
 108th Operations Support Squadron
 141st Air Refueling Squadron (KC-135R) "New Jersey", Orange Fin Flash
 140th Cyber Operations Squadron
 The 140th Cyber Operations Squadron is one of the twelve Air National Guard Cyber Protection Teams that defend networks and systems against threats.
 150th Special Operations Squadron (C-32B) 
 204th Intelligence Squadron
 The 204th Intelligence Squadron is the first Air National Guard squadron that is solely dedicated to providing intelligence instruction and training products to the Air Mobility Command. It is also the first course of its kind in the intelligence community that integrates active duty, Air National Guard and Air Force Reserve students.

During World War II, the group operated primarily in the Southwest Pacific Theater. It was the most successful Republic P-47 Thunderbolt unit in the Pacific War. The Group's commander, Colonel Neel Kearby ran up 20+ kills, including a 6-kills-in-1-mission, for which he was awarded the Medal of Honor. The Group scored 396 kills, over half of all the kills credited to Fifth Air Force P-47s, and won two United States Distinguished Unit Citations. The Group had 20 P-47 aces, including Bob Rowland, Lawrence O'Neill, Bill Banks, Bill Dunham, Walt Benz, Sam Blair, Robert Sutcliffe, and George Davis, who would later be awarded the Medal of Honor flying F-86s during the Korean War.

On 24 May 1946, the group was redesignated as the 108th Fighter Group and allotted to the National Guard.

History

World War II
The 348th Fighter Group was activated at Mitchel Army Airfield, New York, on 30 September 1942. It was equipped with the P-47 Thunderbolt. The 348th was one of the first USAAF groups to be equipped with the P-47.

1943

After an extended period of training in the northeast United States, the personnel boarded the Army transport ship Henry Gibbons and left the wharf at Weehawken, New Jersey on 15 May 1943. They groups personnel all thought they were heading for the European theatre of war. However, they went through the Panama Canal instead and crossed the Pacific Ocean reaching Brisbane, Australia on 14 June 1943. They moved to Archer Field (Archerfield airfield) and waited for their aircraft to arrive.

The group's P-47D Thunderbolts began to arrive in Brisbane in the same month, and by the end of July after they had "run in" their engines on local training flights, the group began long-range missions to strike at Japanese targets in New Guinea. In mid-June the 348th's three squadrons (340th, 341st, 342d) made the 1,200-mile flight from Brisbane to Port Moresby, New Guinea. The group operated from New Guinea and Noemfoor until November 1944, flying patrol and reconnaissance missions and escorted bombers to targets in New Guinea and New Britain. The 460th Fighter Squadron, stationed at Noemfoor, New Guinea, was also later attached to the 348th Fighter Group on 23 September 1944 .

The arrival of the 348th as the first P-47 group in the Southwest Pacific area coincided with the opening of the Allied offensive in New Guinea. During the summer of 1943 the P-47 missions were chiefly as cover for bombers in the Lae-Salamaua area, and for transports carrying supplies to the new mountain locked airstrip at Tsili, only a few miles from the Japanese held Markham Valley. The group met its first air combat over Tsili on 16 August 1943, when two squadrons tangled with the fighter cover of an enemy bomber formation, and shot down three aircraft.

In September the 348th's planes provided cover for the paratroop landing at Nadzab in the Markham valley, and with the capture of Nadzab and Lae the group entered into one of the most spectacular phases of its overseas career, in a series of fighter sweeps, generally by flights of four planes, over the Japanese stronghold of Wewak.

Lieutenant Colonel Neel Kearby, the Commanding Officer of the 348th Fighter Group shot down his first Japanese aircraft on 4 September 1943. He shot down a second aircraft on 15 September 1943. Colonel Kearby was awarded the Medal of Honor for action over New Guinea on 11 October 1943. After leading a flight of four fighters to reconnoiter the enemy base at Wewak, Lt Col Kearby sighted a Japanese bomber formation escorted by more than 30 fighters. Despite the heavy odds and a low fuel supply, and although his mission had been accomplished, Kearby ordered an attack, personally destroying six of the enemy planes. For covering Allied landings and supporting ground forces on New Britain, 16–31 December 1943, the group was awarded a Distinguished Unit Citation.

1944
In 1944 the group began to attack airfields, installations, and shipping in western New Guinea, Ceram, and Halmahera to aid in neutralizing those areas preparatory to the US invasion of the Philippines. The group's pilots shot down 100 Japanese planes without the loss of a single pilot in aerial combat. From Finschhafen the group flew its first fighter-bomber missions. In the early spring of 1944, while the group was at Saidor, fighter-bomber work began in earnest with attacks on the Japanese concentrations in the Hansa Bay region just ahead of the advancing Australian troops

After 18 months in New Guinea the 348th boarded ship and plane for the Philippines. One squadron, the 460th, arrived several weeks before the other three, and proceeded to roll up an imposing score of enemy planes, shipping, and personnel destroyed, providing cover for convoys, flying patrols, escorted bombers, attacked enemy airfields, and supporting ground forces. During a three-week period it sank 50,000 tons of enemy shipping, which was slightly more than one-tenth of all the shipping sunk by the entire Fifth Air Force during the year 1944. On 10 November the 460th squadron deployed forward to Tacloban Airfield on Leyte, simultaneously escorting a group of B-25 bombers attacking a convoy loaded with an estimated 10,000 enemy troops en route to reinforce the Japanese army on Leyte. The squadron's planes were the first of the Army Air Force to fly over occupied Manila after the Japanese capture of the Philippines. A flight led by Colonel Dunham, made the first return flight on 17 November 1944.

The group's greatest day, in point of total of enemy planes destroyed, was 14 December 1944 when, in protection of the invasion fleet heading to Mindoro, 5 Japanese planes were shot down, an estimated 75 were destroyed and 20 more damaged, on the airfields of Negros Island only a few minutes flight from the Allied invasion force, which landed on Mindoro the following morning.

In aerial combat at the 348th's best day came on 24 December 1944 when its planes escorting B-24 Liberator heavy bombers in one of the first bomber strikes on Clark Field, met an attempted interception by an estimated 100 Japanese fighters. 32 of the enemy aircraft were definitely destroyed, 7 probably destroyed, the remainder were driven off, and the bombers proceeded undamaged to carry out their mission.

Early in December 1944, while the group's planes were operating from Taoloban strip, the majority of group personnel were camped inland near Burauen when the Japanese landed several hundred paratroops on an uncompleted airstrip less than a quarter of a mile from the group's camp, cutting the only road leading from the camp. For several days the camp was isolated between the paratroops on the East and the Japanese patrols on the West. Two men on guard post were surprised and killed by an enemy patrol, but the camp defense's prevented any breakthrough and the paratroops were finally wiped out by infantry and tanks.

When U.S. troops landed on Luzon the 348th, now in process of conversion from P-47's to North American P-51 Mustangs, began operation from San Marcelino airstrip a few days after the landing at San Marcelino and Subic Bay. From this location the unit entered upon what many of its members consider its most outstanding work of the war, bombing and strafing in close support of ground troops. This work lacks the excitement and glamor of serial combat, or even of bombing and strafing of seen targets. Bombs and bullets are poured into areas where the enemy is reported to be, and day after day the mission reports stated "Results unobserved due to foliage". Only rarely were advancing ground troops able to tell what part of the damage found was done by a particular air strike.

1945
At the time the 348th began ground support operations from San Marcelino, the infantry had taken Subic Bay and Olongapo and had started east with the objective of sealing off Bataan so that the Japanese, retreating southward from Lingayen, could not use the Bataan Peninsula's defensive strength as did the U.S. forces in 1942. However, a few miles East of Olongapo stubborn Japanese resistance suddenly had been met in Zigzag Pass, where the road climbed in a series of hairpin turns overlooked by the enemy's positions. Our ground forces had suffered some casualties, had dug in, and in four days had been unable to make any appreciable gain.

On Leyte the 348th had done experimental bombing with a new and highly effective firebomb weapon, and it was proposed that it be used to break the deadlock in Zigzag Pass. However the infantry division occupying the west end of the pass was uncertain about the use of the bomb in close support of their troops, for fear of inaccurate bombing. So a Japanese supply area, well back of their front line, was bombed as a demonstration of accuracy, and was left neatly blanked with flame. There was no further lack of confidence. American infantry proceeded to direct our pilots to bomb and strafe just ahead of their front line, and for seven days advanced steadily until their mission of scaling off the Bataan Peninsula had been accomplished.

Occasionally the curtain of "unobserved results" would lift. One strike, directed by Filipino guerrillas who set off smoke pots to mark tan enemy bivouac area, was later found to have caused 700 Japanese casualties.

After another strike west of Fort Stotsenburg, ground troops were able to move in quickly and found 574 Japanese, all killed by the single air attack. Neigher of those missions involved more than 32 sorties and 30 missions a day. It would be impossible to estimate how many other thousands of enemy dead were covered with the phrase "results unobserved".

During the month of April 1945 the 348th net a record for tonnage of bombs dropped on the enemy, with a total of 2091.5 tons. Total ammunition expended was just under two million rounds. So far as is known, this bomb tonnage is the greatest every dropped in one month by any group, either fighter or bomber, and the accuracy of the bombing attested repeatedly by reports from ground observers. Most of the record tonnage was dropped in the Ipo Dam area northeast of Manila, and helped pave the way for the infantry's capture of that vital control-point of Manila's water supply. From San Marcelino the 348th also flew missions over French Indochina, Hainan, China, and Formosa.

In May 1945 the group moved to Floridablanca airfield, west of Fort Stotsenburg, and from there continued attacks on Japanese ground troops, chiefly in the Cagayan Valley in northern Luzon. By the middle of June the enemy forces had disintegrated and scattered so that profitable targets were hard to find, So operations of the 348th were redirected to the Ryukyus, and the group began operations from Ie Shima in mid-July.

Contrary to expectations the Japanese air forces did not choose to fight, and in the following month only 15 enemy planes were shot down without loss to the 348th in air combat. However, there was an abundance of ground and shipping targets in Kyūshū and North China, and the group's P-51s took a constant toll of enemy transportation on water and land before the afternoon of 14 August when the planes of the 348th delivered the last bombs dropped on Japan before the order was given to "cease firing".

In the immediate postwar era, the group moved to Itami Airfield, Japan in October 1945 as part of Far East Air Forces, performing occupation duty.  The 348th Fighter Group was inactivated at Itami Airfield on 10 May 1946.

Summary of Victories
Colonel Kearby went on to score 22 aerial victories. Other aerial aces of the group were Lt. Colonel W.D. Dunham – 16, Lieutenant Colonel William M. Banks – 9, Colonel R.R. Rowland – 8, Major W.G. Benz – 8, Lieutenant Colonel E.F. Roddy – 8, Major S.V. Blair – 7, Captain G.A. Davis Jr. – 7, Captain M.E. Grant – 7, Major J.T. Moore – 7, Major E.S. Popek – 7, Major N.M. Brown – 6, Captain R.H. Fleischer – 6, Captain W.B. Foulis – 6, Captain R.C. Sutcliffe - 5, and First Lieutenant L.F. O'Neill - 5.

Air National Guard
The 348th Fighter Group was redesignated as the 108th Fighter Group and allotted to the New Jersey National Guard on 24 May 1946. It was organized at Newark Municipal Airport and extended federal recognition later that year. Two of its World War squadrons, the 341st (now the 141st Fighter Squadron) and 342d (now the 142d Fighter Squadron) were assigned to it, along with the 119th Fighter Squadron, which had been an observation squadron in the National Guard before the war. The 119th was located with group headquarters at Newark Municipal Airport, while the 141st was at Mercer Airport, near the state capital of Trenton, New Jersey.  The 142d was an element of the Delaware National Guard at New Castle, Delaware.

Initially, the group reported to the 52d Fighter Wing of the New York National Guard and was supported by the 208th Air Service Group.  In the fall of 1950, the Air National Guard reorganized its combat units under the wing base organization that had been used by the regular Air Force since 1947.  In this reorganization, the 108th Fighter Wing was formed as the headquarters for the 108th Group and its support elements, organized into the 108th Air Base Group, 108th Maintenance and Supply Group and the 108th Medical Group.

Mobilization for the Korean War

In March 1951, the group was called to active duty and moved to Turner Air Force Base, Georgia, where it became part of Strategic Air Command.  Only the 141st Fighter Squadron remained with the group on mobilization. To fill out the unit, the 149th Fighter Squadron of the Virginia Air National Guard and the 153d Fighter Squadron of the Mississippi Air National Guard were assigned to the group.   In May, the group and its squadrons became fighter bomber units.

Air defense

With return to state control, the group assumed the air defense mission.  Despite its retention of the fighter bomber designation, it was gained by Air Defense Command (ADC) upon mobilization.  ADC required the squadrons it gained to be designed to augment active duty squadrons capable of performing air defense missions for an indefinite period after mobilization independently of their parent wing. It was not until 1955 that the group was redesignated the 108th Fighter-Interceptor Group, when it received its first North American F-86E Sabres.  Once again, the group commanded the 119th and 141st Squadrons, but not the 142d, which became part of another group.  In October 1958, its parent received a new mission as the 108th Tactical Fighter Wing and the group was briefly inactivated.

Tactical fighter

The 108th Wing had been mobilized during the Berlin Crisis of 1961.  This mobilization demonstrated that although mobilizing a wing with dispersed flying units was not a problem when the entire wing was called to active service, mobilizing individual flying squadron and elements to support it proved difficult. To resolve this, the Air Force determined to reorganize its National Guard wings by establishing groups with support elements for each of its squadrons to facilitate mobilization of elements of wings in various combinations when needed. Shortly after the 108th Wing returned to state control in July, the group was again activated as this plan was implemented.  The group remained active until December 1974, when the Air Force inactivated groups located on the same station as the wing to which they were assigned.

Objective wing
In 1973 the group was activated again as the 108th Operations Group as the Air Force implemented the Objective Wing organization in the Air National Guard.  It once again became the flying organization of the 108th Wing, equipped with Boeing KC-135 Stratotankers.

The 150th Special Operations Squadron was later added to the group, flying Boeing C-32s.

Lineage
 Constituted as the 348th Fighter Group on 24 September 1942
 Activated on 30 September 1942
 Inactivated on 10 May 1946
 Redesignated 108th Fighter Group, Single Engine and allotted to the National Guard on 24 May 1946
 Activated on 15 August 1946
 Federally recognized on 16 October 1946
 Federalized and called to active duty, 1 March 1951
 Redesignated 108th Fighter-Bomber Group on 16 May 1951
 Released from active duty and returned to New Jersey state control on 1 December 1952
 Redesignated 108th Fighter-Interceptor Group on 1 July 1955
 Inactivated on 1 July 1958
 Redesignated: 108th Tactical Fighter Group 
 Activated on 1 July 1958
 Federalized and called to active duty, 1 October 1961
 Released from active duty and returned to New Jersey state control on 30 August 1962
 Inactivated on 9 December 1974
 Redesignated 108th Operations Group
 Activated c. 1 January 1993

Assignments
 I Fighter Command, 30 September 1942 (attached to New York Fighter Wing until 29 October 1942, Boston Fighter Wing until 9 May 1943)
 V Fighter Command, 23 Jun 1943 – 10 May 1946 (attached to First Air Task Force c. 14 Aug 1943-c. 31 Jan 1944, 310th Bombardment Wing 1 May-25 Aug 1944, 309th Bombardment Wing until 7 November 1944, 85th Fighter Wing until 8 February 1945, 309th Bombardment Wing until 25 September 1945, 310th Bombardment Wing until 25 March 1946)
 New Jersey National Guard, 15 August 1946
 52d Fighter Wing, c. 1 October 1947
 108th Fighter Wing (later 108th Fighter-Bomber Wing), 1 November 1950 – 1 December 1952
 108th Fighter-Bomber Wing (later 108th Fighter Interceptor Wing), 1 December 1952 – 1 October 1958
 108th Tactical Fighter Wing, 1 October 1962 – 9 December 1974
 108th Air Refueling Wing (later 108th Wing), c. 1 January 1993 – present

Components
 119th Fighter Squadron (later 119th Fighter-Bomber Squadron, 119th Fighter-Interceptor Squadron), 28 December 1946 – c. 1950, c. March 1953 - 1 October 1958, 1 October 1961 – 15 October 1962
 141st Tactical Fighter Squadron (later 141st Air Refueling Squadron): 8 September 1973 – 9 December 1974, 1 October 1993 – present
 149th Fighter Squadron, 28 February 1951 – 1 December 1951
 150th Air Refueling Squadron (later 150th Special Operations Squadron), 1 October 1993 – 31 March 2008, unknown – present
 153d Fighter Squadron (later 153d Fighter-Bomber Squadron), 28 February 1951 – 1 December 1952
 340th Fighter Squadron: 30 September 1942 – 10 May 1946
 341st Fighter Squadron (later 141st Fighter Squadron, 141st Fighter-Bomber Squadron, 141st Fighter-Interceptor Squadron: 30 September 1942 – 10 May 1946, c. 26 May 1949 – 1 December 1952, 1 December 1952 – 1 October 1958, 1 October 1962 – 8 September 1973
 342d Fighter Squadron (later 142d Fighter Squadron): 30 September 1942 – 10 May 1946, 6 September 1946 – 1 November 1950
 460th Fighter Squadron: 23 September 1944 – 10 May 1946

Stations

 Mitchel Field, New York, 30 September 1942
 Bradley Field, Connecticut, 4 October 1942
 Westover Field, Massachusetts, 29 October 1942
 Providence Airport, Rhode Island, c. 3 January 1943
 Westover Field, Massachusetts, 28 April-9 May 1943
 Jackson Airfield (7 Mile Drome), Port Moresby, Papua New Guinea, 23 June 1943
 Finschhafen Airfield, New Guinea, 16 December 1943
 Saidor Airfield, New Guinea, 29 March 1944
 Wakde Airfield, Netherlands East Indies, 22 May 1944
 Kornasoren Airfield Noemfoor, Schouten Islands, New Guinea, 26 August 1944
 Tacloban Airfield, Leyte, Philippines, 16 November 1944
 Tanauan Airfield, Leyte, Philippines, 4 February 1945
 Floridablanca Airfield, Luzon, Philippines, 15 May 1945
 Ie Shima Airfield, Okinawa, 9 July 1945
 Itami Airfield, Japan, October 1945 – 10 May 1946
 Newark Municipal Airport, New Jersey, 15 August 1946
 Turner Air Force Base, Georgia, 1 March 1951
 Godman Air Force Base, Kentucky, 11 December 1951 – 1 December 1952
 McGuire Air Force Base (later Joint Base McGuire Dix Lakehurst), New Jersey, 1 December 1952 – present

Aircraft

 Republic P-47 Thunderbolt, 1942–1945, 1946–1952
 North American P-51 Mustang, 1945, 1952–1955
 North American F-86 Sabre, 1955–1958, 1962–1965
 Republic F-105 Thunderchief, 1965–1974
 Boeing KC-135 Stratotanker, 1993 – present

See also

George Andrew Davis Jr.
Neel E. Kearby

References

 Notes

 Citations

Bibliography

 
 
 Oleson, James. In Their Own Words: the Final Chapter. True Stories From American Fighter Aces., iUniverse, 2011 , 9781450290463
 Stanaway, John C. Kearby's Thunderbolts: A History of the 348th Fighter Group. St. Paul, Minnesota: Phalanx Publishing Company, 1992. 108 pages.
 Stanaway, John C. Kearby's Thunderbolts: The 348th Fighter Group in World War II. Atglen, Pennsylvania: Schiffer Publishing, 1997. . 220 pages.
 Wistrand, R. B. Pacific Sweep: A Pictorial History of the Fifth Air Force Fighter Command. F.H. Johnson, 1945. ASIN: B000ZUS7DW.
 Wyper, W. W. The Youngest Tigers in the Sky. California: the Author, 1980.

External links
 USAAS-USAAC-USAAF-USAF Aircraft Serial Numbers—1908 to present

Military units and formations in New Jersey
Fighter groups of the United States Army Air Forces
Operations groups of the United States Air Force